Buproridae is a family of crustaceans belonging to the order Cyclopoida.

Genera:
 Buprorides Kim & Boxshall, 2021
 Buprorus Thorell, 1859

References

Copepods